= Chris Printup =

Streetwear designer

Chris Printup was an American fashion designer. He was the cofounder of the streetwear brand Born X Raised.

== Early life ==
In November 2023, Born X Raised held a tribute to Printup at their annual Sadie Hawkins Winter Formal.
